Harry Hurwitz (January 27, 1938 – September 21, 1995) was an American film director, screenwriter, actor and producer.

Biography

Hurwitz attended The High School of Music & Art and New York University, where he received a B.S. in 1960 and an M.A. in 1962. Before becoming a director, Hurwitz worked intermittently as a drawing, painting and filmmaking instructor at various institutions, including New York University, the State University of New York at New Paltz, Cooper Union, Parsons School of Design, Queens College, Purchase College, the New York Institute of Technology and the Pratt Institute. His directorial debut film The Projectionist included the first acting role for actor/comedian Rodney Dangerfield. He often used the pseudonym Harry Tampa.

In the early 1970s, Hurwitz was an artist-in-residence at the University of South Florida in Tampa. It was at that time that he produced the black-and-white serigraphic self-portrait that briefly (and inexplicably, as the film is set in Los Angeles) appears on the walls of the main character May's (Susan Dey) apartment in the 1986 film Echo Park.

Painting
As a painter, Hurwitz has work in the permanent collections of the Metropolitan Museum of Art, the National Gallery of Art, the Corcoran Gallery of Art (now defunct) and the Philadelphia Museum of Art.

Filmography

References

External links

1938 births
1995 deaths
Male actors from New York City
American male screenwriters
American painters
American television directors
Cooper Union faculty
New York University faculty
Parsons School of Design faculty
Film directors from New York City
The High School of Music & Art alumni
New York University alumni
State University of New York at New Paltz faculty
Queens College, City University of New York faculty
New York Institute of Technology faculty
Pratt Institute faculty
State University of New York at Purchase faculty
20th-century American male actors
Screenwriters from New York (state)
20th-century American male writers
20th-century American writers
20th-century American screenwriters